Localized granuloma annulare is a skin condition of unknown cause, tending to affect children and young to middle-aged adults, usually appearing on the lateral or dorsal surfaces of the fingers or hands, elbows, dorsal feet, and ankles.

See also 
 Granuloma annulare
 Skin lesion

References 

Monocyte- and macrophage-related cutaneous conditions